Cima Portule is a mountain in Italy, located in the province of Vicenza in the Veneto region.

Mountains of Veneto
Vicentine Alps
Mountains of the Alps
Mountains of Italy